Gaëlle Solal (born 21 September 1978) is a French female classical guitarist.

Biography 
Born in Marseille in 1978, Solal began her musical studies at the age of 6 with Christian Bullot and Sylvain Cinquini then with René Bartoli at the Conservatoire de Marseille. At 14, she was unanimously awarded three gold medals (guitar, musical training, chamber music) and the 1st Grand Prix of the city of Marseille. At the age of 16, she entered the Conservatoire de Paris where she obtained the 1st Prize for guitar unanimously as well as the cycle of perfection with Roland Dyens.

1st Grand Prize of the Michele Pittaluga International Classical Guitar Competition (first French woman to win it), 2nd Prize of the prestigious Guitar Foundation of America, she was finalist at the Concert Artists Guild Competition in New York, winner of the Beracasa, Meyer, Contestabile Foundations. She then began an international career: Festival de Radio France in Montpellier, Flâneries musicales de Reims, Festival de Torroella de Montgrí, Salle Cortot, Théâtre de la Villette, Cité de la Musique, Purcell Room in London. Tours will follow in India, Africa, Southeast Asia, United States, Mexico, Canada and Germany. She has given concerts in about thirty countries.

Passionate about contemporary music, she has performed Maurice Ohana's Concerto for the first time in Italy, the world premiere of N. Sekiya's Concerto with Kent Nagano, the premiere of three new pieces at the Córdoba Festival, the world premiere of a piece for clarinet and guitar by Félix Ibarrondo with Florent Héau.

Solal divides her time between concerts, master classes and international competition juries; she has taught at the Conservatories of Cordoba (2003 to 2004) and Seville (2004 to 2009).

Awards 
 1998: 1st Frenchwoman to win the 1st prize of the Michele Pittaluga International Classical Guitar Competition
 2006: 2nd prize of the Guitar Foundation of America

Other formations 
 Duo bandonéon/guitare with Jérémy Vannereau

References

External links 
 Official website
 Gaëlle Solal (France Musique)
 Gaëlle Solal  (classical guitar society of calgary) 
 Gaelle Solal plays Choros n°1 by Heitor Villa-Lobos (YouTube)

French classical guitarists
French women guitarists
Women classical guitarists
1978 births
Living people
Musicians from Marseille
Conservatoire de Paris alumni
21st-century guitarists
French Republican Guard Band musicians
21st-century women guitarists